Grosvenor B. Clarkson (September 13, 1882 – January 23, 1937) was an author, publicist, and Director of the Council of National Defense during World War I.

Early life
Grosvenor B. Clarkson was born on September 13, 1882, in Des Moines, Iowa to Anna Howell and James S. Clarkson.

Career

Clarkson worked in New Mexico for the U.S. Department of the Interior and later for the United States Naval Consulting Board.  Afterwards, he was recruited for the Council of National Defense, where he succeeded Walter S. Gifford as Director. He served as director from December 1918 to March 1920.

After the war, he published a detailed account of his time as Director in Industrial America in the World War.

He was the author of two books:
 An Analysis of the High Cost of Living Problem, as Director; Council of National Defense, (1919)
 Industrial America in the World War; the strategy behind the line, 1917-1918, (1923)

Personal life and death
Clarkson died on January 23, 1937, in New York City.

References

External links
 Grosvenor B. Clarkson, Columbia University

1882 births
1937 deaths
American writers
American publicists
Council of National Defense